Thamarakulam is a village in Alappuzha district in the Indian state of Kerala.
Located in Alappuzha District of Kerala, Thamarakulam is around 16 km south-east of Kayamkulam. It is located close to the border of Kollam District. Kayamkulam, Mavelikara, Adoor, Ochira and Sasthamkotta are nearby towns. Nearest airport is Trivandrum International Airport, which is 110 km south. Sasthamkotta Railway Station is the nearest railhead. Kayamkulam Junction Railway Station is a major railhead nearby.

Thamarakkulam area was under the Naduvazhi rule during the 16th to 19th century. "Moothanedathu Pillamar", an offshoot of Kayamkulam Raja, ruled the area during this time.The notable film director "kannan Thamarakkulam"from here.

And The famous tug of war team "Navakerala Thamarakulam" from here.!

Demographics 
 India census, Thamarakulam had a population of 26438 with 12756 males and 13682 females.

Near By Interests 
 Irappan para water falls 
 Vayyankara chira
 Nediyanikal Devi temple

References

Villages in Alappuzha district